Erfurt I is an electoral constituency (German: Wahlkreis) represented in the Landtag of Thuringia. It elects one member via first-past-the-post voting. Under the current constituency numbering system, it is designated as constituency 24. It contains northern parts of Erfurt, the capital and largest city of Thuringia.

Erfurt I was created in 1990 for the first state election. Since 2009, it has been represented by Karola Stange of The Left.

Geography
As of the 2019 state election, Erfurt I is located entirely within the urban district of Erfurt. It covers the northern part of the city, specifically the city districts (Stadtteile) of Alach, Azmannsdorf, Gispersleben, Hochstedt, Hohenwinden, Kerspleben, Kühnhausen, Linderbach, Mittelhausen, Moskauer Platz, Rieth, Roter Berg, Schaderode, Schwerborn, Stotternheim, Sulzer Siedlung, Tiefthal, Töttelstädt, Töttleben, Vieselbach, and Wallichen.

Members
The constituency was held by the Christian Democratic Union (CDU) from its creation in 1990 until 2004, during which time it was represented by Johanna Arenhövel. It was won by the Party of Democratic Socialism (PDS) in 2004, and represented by then-state leader Bodo Ramelow. In 2009, Ramelow instead ran in Erfurt III, and Erfurt I was won by Karola Stange of The Left, successor party of the PDS. She was re-elected in 2014 and 2019.

Election results

2019 election

2014 election

2009 election

2004 election

1999 election

1994 election

1990 election

References

Electoral districts in Thuringia
Erfurt
1990 establishments in Germany
Constituencies established in 1990